Operation Kangaroo, or Operación Canguro was part of an informal immigration initiative — "informal" due to the fact that there were no formal diplomatic relationship between the two countries — that brought male, Spanish, assisted migrants to Australia to work as cane-cutters in North Queensland.

First contingent
The first group arrived in Brisbane, Queensland, in the SS Toscana (Lloyd Triestino Line), on 9 August 1958.

See also
 Plan Martha

Footnotes

References
 Garcia, Ignacio (2002), Operación Canguro: the Spanish Migration Scheme, 1958-1963, Jamison Center, ACT: Spanish Heritage Foundation.
 Mason, Robert (2018), The Spanish Anarchists of Northern Australia: Revolution in the Sugar Cane Fields, Cardiff : University of Wales Press. 
 Tao, Kim (2018), The 60th anniversary of the Spanish migration agreement, Australian National Maritime Museum, 6 August 2018.

External links
 Spanish migrants mark 60 years since 'Operation Kangaroo', SBSSpanish, 17 December 2018.

Human migration
History of immigration to Australia
Australia–Spain relations
Spanish emigrants to Australia